Li Yan (born July 19, 1984) is a Chinese footballer who plays as a midfielder for Shanxi Longjin in the China League Two.

Club career
Li started his senior career in 2002 with China League Two club Guangzhou Sunray Cave Easter. He made 14 appearances in 2003 league season and moved to second tier club Guangzhou Sunray Cave in 2004, however he was often used as a substitute in the early years. He was loaned out to Guangzhou Easter's second team, which was about to participate in the 2004/05 Hong Kong First Division League season and returned to Guangzhou in the summer of 2005. Li scored his first goal for Guangzhou on 16 July 2005, three days before his 21st Birthday. He scored the winning goal in injury time, which ensured Guangzhou win Qingdao Hailifeng 2-1.

In the 2007 league season Shen Xiangfu came in as manager, which saw Li steadily established himself in Guangzhou and was a key player within the club as they went on to win the division title. Within the top tier Li adapted very well within the league and was a vital member of the team that saw Guangzhou establish themselves as regulars within the division, however at the end of the 2009 Chinese Super League campaign it was discovered that the club had fixed a game during 2006 and were punished with relegation. Li would however remain faithful toward Guangzhou and played a key role as they immediately won promotion and the division title at the end of the 2010 league season. As this was going on the Evergrande Real Estate Group invested heavily within the club by bringing in Chinese international Zheng Zhi and South Korean international Cho Won-Hee into central midfield. This would limit Li's playing time and despite being part of the team that went on to win the 2011 Chinese Super League title he only played in a handful of games.

Li was loaned to Guangzhou R&F on 11 July 2012. He made 11 appearances for the Blues in the second half of the 2012 league season. On 9 November, Guangzhou R&F announced that they had made the move permanent with an undisclosed fee.

On 21 January 2016, Li transferred to his hometown club Baoding Yingli ETS in the China League Two.

Career statistics
Statistics accurate as of match played 31 December 2020.

Honours

Club
Guangzhou Evergrande
 Chinese Super League: 2011
 China League One: 2007, 2010
 Chinese FA Super Cup: 2012

References

External links
Player profile at 7m.cn

1984 births
Living people
Sportspeople from Baoding
Chinese footballers
Footballers from Hebei
Hong Kong First Division League players
Guangzhou F.C. players
Guangzhou City F.C. players
Baoding Yingli Yitong players
Chinese Super League players
China League One players
Association football midfielders
21st-century Chinese people